The Corio-PBP RNA motif is a conserved RNA structure that was discovered by bioinformatics.
Corio-PBP motifs are found in Coriobacteriaceae, which is a lineage of Actinomycetota.

It is ambiguous whether Corio-PBP RNAs function as cis-regulatory elements or whether they operate in trans.  Corio-PBP RNAs are often located upstream of genes encoding periplasmic-binding protein transporters.  However, the substrate specificity of these transporters has not been determined.

References

Non-coding RNA